The Kuju Castle is a military fortress from the Goryeo period, located in Kusong, North Korea. 

The fortress was the site of the defeat of the Khitan invasion in 1018 under the command of Gang Gam-chan. The site is number 60 on the list of National Treasure of North Korea.

See also
Battle of Kuju
Siege of Kuju

References

External links
Gujuseong at Encyclopedia of Korean Culture 

National Treasures of North Korea
Castles in North Korea
Buildings and structures in North Pyongan Province